Montejurra in Spanish and Jurramendi in Basque are the names of a mountain in Navarre region (Spain). Each year, it hosts a Carlist celebration in remembrance of the 1873 Battle of Montejurra during the Third Carlist War. In 2004, approximately 1,000 persons turned out.

Between 1960 and 1971, the Carlists were publishing a monthly magazine named Montejurra.

On 9 May 1976, during the Spanish Transition, far right-wing gunmen supported by the Spanish secret services, killed two people at a ceremony held by the left-wing Carlist Party. This became known as the Montejurra Incidents.  The Carlist Party organizes an annual gathering at Montejurra, where Carlists and other leftists honor the dead.

External links

Montejurra Events

Mountains of Navarre
Carlism